Princeton is an unincorporated community in Granite County, Montana, United States, located  north-east of Phillipsburg and  south of Drummond.

External links 

 Princeton on Google Maps

Unincorporated communities in Granite County, Montana